McCullough is an unincorporated community in Escambia County, Alabama, United States.

History
McCullough was named for Warren Hill McCullough, who settled in the area in the 1890s. McCullough was on the Muscle Shoals, Birmingham & Pensacola Railway. At one time, McCullough was home to a cotton gin, several saw mills, a school, drug store, and multiple general stores.

A post office operated under the name McCullough from 1914 to 1989.

References

Unincorporated communities in Alabama
Unincorporated communities in Escambia County, Alabama